Fathabad (also Romanized as Fatḩābād; also known as Chāh Gaz, Chehel Gaz, Chehil Gazi, and Fatḩābād-e Chehel Gazī) is a village in Ernan Rural District, in the Central District of Mehriz County, Yazd Province, Iran. At the 2006 census, its population was 64, in 23 families.

References 

Populated places in Mehriz County